Market Hall was a ward of the County Borough of Birmingham. It covered an area of central Birmingham, including at times the districts of Lee Bank, Edgbaston around Carpenters Rd and Wellington Rd and the western part of Balsall Heath.

Ward History
The ward has been in existence since the 1830s and the boundaries have changed at various times since then. 
The boundary changes of 1934 created a ward that covered the city centre, together with the Lee Bank area south west of the centre.

In the boundary changes of 1950 the electorate had declined to the extent that a substantial area of the Edgbaston ward was added, and this was the area bounded by the railway line, Church Rd, Priory Rd, Bristol Rd, Pebble Mill Rd, the River Rea and then Highgate St.

In the boundary changes of 1961 the ward was abolished and was split between Edgbaston and Ladywood wards, with the area north of Lee Bank and Belgrave Roads going to Ladywood (the city centre and Lee Bank), and south of those roads going to Edgbaston.

Parliamentary Representation
The ward has been part of Birmingham Edgbaston constituency from the constituencies creation in 1918 until its abolition in 1962. However the area that the ward covered continued to be part of the constituency until (and including) the 1970 election.

Politics
The ward was generally a Conservative ward, although Labour did win it on odd occasions.

Election results

1950s

1940s

Former wards of Birmingham, West Midlands